Spelle is a municipality in the Emsland district, in Lower Saxony, Germany. It is situated approximately 20 km southeast of Lingen, and 10 km north of Rheine.

Spelle is also the seat of the Samtgemeinde ("collective municipality") Spelle.

References

Emsland